Epiblema scutulana is a moth of the family Tortricidae. It is found in the Palearctic realm. The species closely resembles Epiblema sticticana and Epiblema cirsiana, identification is only possible on the basis of microscopic examination of the genitalia.

The wingspan is 18–23 mm. The moth flies from May to September in western Europe.

The larvae feed on spear thistle and musk thistle.

References

External links

 waarneming.nl 
 Lepidoptera of Belgium
 Epiblema scutulana at UKmoths

Eucosmini
Tortricidae of Europe
Insects of Turkey
Moths described in 1775